Dormitz is a Bavarian municipality in the district of Forchheim (Upper Franconia) and the administrative headquarters of the Dormitz community, which includes the parishes of Kleinsendelbach and Hetzles.

History

Dormitz was first mentioned in 1142 and 1146 in two documents.

References

Forchheim (district)